'74 Jailbreak is an EP by Australian rock band AC/DC, released in 1984. It is composed of five tracks that had previously been released only in Australia. Despite the EP's title, the song "Jailbreak" was actually recorded in 1976 and was originally released that year on the Australian version of the Dirty Deeds Done Dirt Cheap album. The EP's four other tracks were originally released on the Australian version of the band's debut album, High Voltage, recorded in 1974 and released early the following year.

The song "Jailbreak" was released as a single with accompanying music video at the same time as the EP.  '74 Jailbreak was re-released worldwide in 2003 as part of the AC/DC Remasters series.

Track listing

Personnel 
 Bon Scott – lead vocals
 Angus Young –  lead guitar (tracks 1 and 5), rhythm guitar
 Malcolm Young – rhythm guitar, lead guitar (tracks 2, 3 and 4), backing vocals
 George Young – production, backing vocals, drums – bass guitar on all but Jailbreak 
 Mark Evans – bass guitar on "Jailbreak"
 Phil Rudd – drums & percussion on "Jailbreak"
 Tony Currenti – drums & percussion on tracks 2-4
 Harry Vanda – production

Certification

References

External links 
 Lyrics on AC/DC's official website

1984 EPs
Atlantic Records EPs
1984 compilation albums
Atlantic Records compilation albums
AC/DC EPs
AC/DC compilation albums
Albums produced by George Young (rock musician)
Albums produced by Harry Vanda